Much Ado About Nothing is a 1973 Soviet romantic comedy film directed by Samson Samsonov based on William Shakespeare's play of the same name.

Cast
Galina Jovovich - Beatrice
Konstantin Raikin - Benedicto
Tatyana Vedeneyeva - Gero
Leonid Trushkin - Claudio
Boris Ivanov - Leonato
Alexei Samoilov - Prince
Vladimir Korenev - Juan
Alexei Dobronravov - Antonio
Erast Garin - Kissel
Pavel Pavlenko - Dogberry
Vladimir Doveyko Sr. (voiced by Vladimir Basov) - Boracchio
Mikhail Logvinov - Conrad
Tatyana Bronzova
Yury Yakovlev (uncredited)

References

External links

Mosfilm films
Films based on Much Ado About Nothing
Soviet romantic comedy films
Russian romantic comedy films